The Tench Baronetcy, of Low Leyton in the County of Essex, was a title in the Baronetage of Great Britain. It was created in 1715 for Fisher Tench, a financier and member of parliament for Southwark. The title became extinct on the death of the second Baronet in 1737.

Tench baronets, of Low Leyton (1715)
Sir Fisher Tench, 1st Baronet (–1736)
Sir Nathaniel Tench, 2nd Baronet (1697–1737)

References

Extinct baronetcies in the Baronetage of Great Britain